"The Canterville Ghost" is a humorous short story by Oscar Wilde. It was the first of Wilde's stories to be published, appearing in two parts in The Court and Society Review, 23 February and 2 March 1887. The story is about an American family who moved to a castle haunted by the ghost of a dead English nobleman, who killed his wife and was then walled in and starved to death by his wife's brothers. It has been adapted for the stage and screen several times.

Summary
The American Minister to the Court of St James's, Hiram B. Otis and his family move into Canterville Chase, an English country house, despite warnings from Lord Canterville that the house is haunted. Mr. Otis says that he will take the furniture as well as the ghost at valuation. The Otis family includes Mr. and Mrs. Otis, their eldest son Washington, their daughter Virginia and the Otis twins. At first, none of the Otis family believes in ghosts but shortly after they move in, none of them can deny the presence of Sir Simon de Canterville. Mrs. Otis notices a mysterious bloodstain on the floor and comments that "She does not at all care for bloodstains in the living room", Mrs. Umney, the housekeeper, tells her that the bloodstain is evidence of the ghost and cannot be removed. Washington Otis, the eldest son, suggests that the stain will be removed with Pinkerton's Champion Stain Remover and Paragon Detergent. When the ghost makes his first appearance, Mr. Otis promptly gets out of bed and pragmatically offers the ghost Tammany Rising Sun Lubricator to oil his chains. Angrily, the ghost throws the bottle and runs into the corridor.

The Otis twins throw pillows on him and the ghost flees. The Otis family witnesses reappearing bloodstains on the floor just by the fireplace, which are removed every time they appear in various colours. Despite the ghost's efforts and most gruesome guises, the family refuses to be frightened, leaving Sir Simon feeling increasingly helpless and humiliated. The Otises remain unconcerned. The ghost falls victim to tripwires, toy peashooters, butter slides and falling buckets of water. The mischievous twins rig up their own "ghost", which frightens him. Sir Simon sees that Virginia, the beautiful and wise fifteen-year-old daughter, is different from the rest of the family. He tells her that he has not slept in three hundred years and wants desperately to do so. The ghost tells her the tragic tale of his wife, Lady Eleanor de Canterville. Virginia listens to him and learns an important lesson, as well as the true meaning behind a riddle. Sir Simon de Canterville says that she must weep for him, for he has no tears; she must pray for him, for he has no faith and then she must accompany him to the Angel of Death and beg for Sir Simon's death. She does weep for him and pray for him and she disappears with Sir Simon through the wainscoting and accompanies him to the Garden of Death and bids the ghost farewell. The story ends with Virginia marrying the Duke of Cheshire after they both come of age. Sir Simon, she tells her husband several years later, helped her understand what life is, what death signifies and why love is stronger than both.

Adaptations

Theatrical films
 The Canterville Ghost, a 1944 Hollywood movie with Charles Laughton in the title role
 Кентервильское привидение, a 1970 Soviet animated film.
 Bhoothnath, a 2008 Bollywood movie adaptation
 The Canterville Ghost, (Le Fantôme de Canterville) a 2016 French-Belgian film.
 The Canterville Ghost, a British animated feature film with the voices of Stephen Fry, Hugh Laurie, and Miranda Hart, originally intended for release in 2016 and currently set for release in 2023.

On television

According to The American Film Institute Catalog, "Among the many other adaptations of Oscar Wilde's story are the following television versions, all titled The Canterville Ghost :"

Sept.28, 1949, on ABC network, directed by Fred Carr and starring Wendy Barrie and Edward Ashley

November 20, 1950, on NBC network’s Robert Montgomery Presents Your Lucky Strike Theatre, starring Cecil Parker and Margaret O'Brien

April 12, 1951, on the Du Mont network,  directed by Frank Wisbar, starring Lois Hall, Reginald Sheffield and Bruce Lester

May 1953, Ziv TV’s syndicated version, directed by Sobey Martin,  starring John Qualen and Connie Marshall

November 9, 1966, The Canterville Ghost, a 1966 ABC television musical that aired 2 November and featured Douglas Fairbanks, Jr., and Michael Redgrave. Featured songs by Fiddler on the Roof songwriters Jerry Bock and Sheldon Harnick.

October 15, 1986, for syndication, directed by Paul Bogart, starring John Gielgud, Ted Wass, Andrea Marcovicci and Alyssa Milano.

On October 31, 2021 a BYUtv and BBC series titled The Canterville Ghost premiered.

In addition to the AFI list:
 The Canterville Ghost, a 1962 British television drama on the BBC Sunday-Night Play featuring Bernard Cribbins.
 The Canterville Ghost (1974), a made-for-TV film starring David Niven. aired on 10 March 1975 in the United States; it also aired in West Germany and France.
 The Canterville Ghost, a 1985 television film starring Richard Kiley, on PBS.
 The Canterville Ghost, a 1988 animated television special.
 Episode 7 of the first series of the British anthology program Mystery and Imagination, which aired 12 March 1966 and featured Bruce Forsyth as the ghost. The episode was wiped after broadcast, but audio-only recordings have survived.
 The Canterville Ghost, a 1996 film for television (ABC), starring Patrick Stewart and Neve Campbell.
 The Canterville Ghost, a 1997 British television film starring Ian Richardson and Celia Imrie
 The Canterville Ghost, a 2001 animated Australian film for television by Burbank Films Australia.

On radio and audio 
 The Canterville Ghost, a June 18, 1945 broadcast of the Lux Radio Theatre, with Charles Laughton and Margaret O'Brien reprising their roles from the 1944 film of the same name.
 Canterville Ghost, a 1974 radio drama adapted by George Lowthar for the CBS Radio Mystery Theater series.
 A radio dramatisation was broadcast on BBC Radio 4 on New Year's Eve 1992.
 A reading of the story by Alistair McGowan was broadcast on BBC Radio 7 in December 2007.
 The Canterville Ghost, a 2011 audiobook production by W F Howes narrated by Rupert Degas

In print 

A graphic novel version published by Classical Comics in 2010 adapted by Scottish writer Sean Michael Wilson, with art by Steve Bryant and Jason Millet

In music 
 The Ghost of Canterville (1965–1966) is an opera by the Russian composer Alexander Knaifel to a libretto by Tatiana Kramarova based on Wilde's story.
 Bílý pán aneb Těžko se dnes duchům straší an opera by Czech composer Jaroslav Křička based on Wilde's story, libretto by J. L. Budín, premiered in 1929. (The Wikipedia pages on Křička in Czech, French, German and Russian contain much more information than the Wikipedia page in English, which is a stub.)
 The Canterville Ghost opera by Gordon Getty. Debut performance at Leipzig Opera on 9 May 2015.
 Tall Stories Theatre Company, created a music-hall adaptation of the story that premiered at the 2018 Edinburgh Festival Fringe and has toured since then. (2018 Festival Review on official website)
 "The Canterville Ghost" is a song by the Austrian symphonic metal band Edenbridge in the album Shine. The song is preceded by an intro track named "The Canterville Prophecy".
 "Dark Depth" is a song by the Serbian thrash metal band Alister from the album Obscurity, heavily influenced by Oscar Wilde's story.
 "El Fantasma de Canterville" is a song by the Argentinian musician Charly García
 Canterville – The musical is a musical by Flavio Gargano, Robert Steiner and Valentina De Paolis
 "The Ghost Of Canterville" is a song by the hard rock band Fans Of The Dark from the 2021 self-titled album Fans Of The Dark. The song focuses on the tragic tale of Sir Simon.

References

External links
 
 
 
 

1887 short stories
Works by Oscar Wilde
British short stories
Uxoricide in fiction
Fictional ghosts
British supernatural television shows
Ghost stories
Works originally published in The Court and Society Review
Ghost narrator
British works adapted into films